Birger Bühring-Andersen (27 March 1907 – 21 January 2001) was a Norwegian sport shooter. He was born in Oslo. He competed at the 1948 Summer Olympics in London, where he placed 8th in the 25 metre rapid fire pistol.

References

1907 births
2001 deaths
Sportspeople from Oslo
Norwegian male sport shooters
Olympic shooters of Norway
Shooters at the 1948 Summer Olympics